Edward Foley (16 March 1747 – 22 June 1803) was the second son of Thomas, 1st Lord Foley.

Like his brother, he was profligate with the great family wealth. His father's will settled the paternal estate at Stoke Edith, Herefordshire together with the manor of Malvern and property bought from Lord Montfort, but limited him to an annuity from the estate, the balance of the income being applied to pay his debts.

He married firstly Lady Anne Coventry (daughter of George Coventry, 6th Earl of Coventry) without having children before the marriage was dissolved by Act of Parliament in 1786. In 1790, he married his distant cousin Eliza Maria Foley Hodgetts, by whom he had two sons, Edward Thomas Foley and John Hodgetts Hodgetts-Foley. She was the heiress of the Prestwood estate, formerly owned by Philip Foley. On their marriage, the Stoke Edith estate was settled to go to their eldest son and the Prestwood estate to their second.

Edward Foley sat as Member of Parliament for Droitwich from April 1768 to May 1774; then for Worcestershire until his death.

A monument on his grave at Stoke Edith is by Robert Blore to a design by Tatham.

References 

 Burkes Peerage
 

1747 births
1803 deaths
People from Herefordshire
Younger sons of barons
Members of the Parliament of Great Britain for Droitwich
Members of the Parliament of Great Britain for Worcestershire
British MPs 1768–1774
British MPs 1774–1780
British MPs 1780–1784
British MPs 1784–1790
British MPs 1790–1796
British MPs 1796–1800
Members of the Parliament of the United Kingdom for Worcestershire
UK MPs 1801–1802
UK MPs 1802–1806
Edward